Warakorn Thongbai (born 22 May 2002) is a Thai footballer currently playing as a forward for Krabi, on loan from Chonburi.

Club career
Born in Samut Prakan province, Warakorn was loaned to Thai League 3 side Banbueng in 2020, alongside teammate Jakkapong Sanmahung. However, after the league was cut short due to the COVID-19 pandemic in Thailand, he returned to parent club Chonburi.

The 2021 season was a better one for Warakorn, with a jump up to the Thai League 2 when he was loaned to Khon Kaen United, again making the move alongside Sanmahung. After six games in the league, he played three times in the promotion play-offs, scoring the winning penalty to send Khon Kaen United to the Thai League 1.

The following year, he was loaned again, this time to Nongbua Pitchaya of Thai League 1. He made eight appearances in the league, scoring once.

International career
Warakorn has represented Thailand at under-14, under-16 and under-19 level.  

Warakorn scored 4 goals in total in the 2018 AFC U-16 Championship qualification while playing for Thailand U16 against Northern Mariana Islands U16 and Timor-Leste U16. 
In the 2018 AFC U-16 Championship, he scored 2 goals for Thailand U16 against Japan U16 and Malaysia U16. 

In the 2020 AFC U-19 Championship qualification, Warakorn scored 2 goals for Thailand U19 against Brunei U19 and Northern Mariana Islands U19. 

He was called up to the under-23 squad for the first time in August 2021.

Career statistics

Club

Notes

References

2002 births
Living people
Warakorn Thongbai
Warakorn Thongbai
Warakorn Thongbai
Association football forwards
Warakorn Thongbai
Warakorn Thongbai
Warakorn Thongbai
Warakorn Thongbai
Warakorn Thongbai
Warakorn Thongbai
Warakorn Thongbai
Warakorn Thongbai